Espey is a surname. Notable people with the surname include:

 James Espey, Irish sailor
 John Espey (1913–2000), novelist, memoirist and literary scholar
 Rich Espey, American playwright

See also
 Esper (name)